Angelo Brofferio (6 December 1802 – 25 May 1866) was a Piedmontese and Italian poet and politician, active during the period of Italian unification.

Literary works
Brofferio was known as "the Piemotic Béranger". His poem entitled Canzoni piemontesi, written in Piedmontese, is among his most noteworthy works.

Tragedies
 Su morre
 Eudossia
 Idomeneo
 Vitige re dei Goti
 Il vampiro
 Mio cugino
 Salvator Rosa
 Il tartufo politico

Other works
 Tradizioni italiane
 Scene elleniche
 Storia delle rivoluzioni italiane dal 1821 al 1848
 Storia del Piemonte dal 1814 ai giorni nostri
 Storia del parlamento subalpino
 I miei tempi

See also
 Unification of Italy

References

External links
 
 .

1802 births
1866 deaths
People from the Province of Asti
Historical Far Left politicians
Deputies of Legislature II of the Kingdom of Sardinia
Deputies of Legislature III of the Kingdom of Sardinia
Deputies of Legislature IV of the Kingdom of Sardinia
Deputies of Legislature V of the Kingdom of Sardinia
Deputies of Legislature VI of the Kingdom of Sardinia
Deputies of Legislature VIII of the Kingdom of Italy
Deputies of Legislature IX of the Kingdom of Italy
People of the Italian unification
University of Turin alumni